Events from the year 1434 in France

Incumbents
 Monarch – Charles VII

Events
 14 April - The foundation stone of Nantes Cathedral is laid

Births
 23 September - Yolande of Valois, princess (died 1478)

Deaths
 Unknown - John I, Duke of Bourbon, nobleman (born 1381)

References

1430s in France